The 1950 St. Louis Cardinals season was the team's 69th season in St. Louis, Missouri and its 59th season in the National League. The Cardinals went 78–75 during the season and finished 5th in the National League.

Offseason 
 December 5, 1949: Bill Sarni was drafted by the Cardinals from the Shreveport Sports in the 1949 minor league draft.
 December 14, 1949: Lou Klein and Ron Northey were traded by the Cardinals to the Cincinnati Reds for Harry Walker.

Regular season

Season standings

Record vs. opponents

Notable transactions 
 September 7, 1950: Peanuts Lowrey was purchased by the Cardinals from the Cincinnati Reds.

Roster

Opening Day Lineup

Player stats

Batting

Starters by position 
Note: Pos = Position; G = Games played; AB = At bats; H = Hits; Avg. = Batting average; HR = Home runs; RBI = Runs batted in

Other batters 
Note: G = Games played; AB = At bats; H = Hits; Avg. = Batting average; HR = Home runs; RBI = Runs batted in

Pitching

Starting pitchers 
Note: G = Games pitched; IP = Innings pitched; W = Wins; L = Losses; ERA = Earned run average; SO = Strikeouts

Other pitchers 
Note: G = Games pitched; IP = Innings pitched; W = Wins; L = Losses; ERA = Earned run average; SO = Strikeouts

Relief pitchers 
Note: G = Games pitched; W = Wins; L = Losses; SV = Saves; ERA = Earned run average; SO = Strikeouts

Farm system 

.LEAGUE CHAMPIONS: Columbus (American Assn.), Winston-Salem, Lebanon

References

External links
1950 St. Louis Cardinals at Baseball Reference
1950 St. Louis Cardinals team page at www.baseball-almanac.com

St. Louis Cardinals seasons
Saint Louis Cardinals season
1950 in sports in Missouri